General Cinema Corporation, also known as General Cinema, GCC, or General Cinema Theatres, was a chain of movie theaters in the United States. At its peak, the company operated about 1,500 screens, some of which were among the first cinemas certified by THX.  The company operated for approximately 67 years, from 1935 until 2002.

History
The General Cinema Corporation was founded as a drive-in theater in 1935 by Philip Smith, who had previously owned a small chain of silent film theaters. Smith had chosen to open the chain after noticing the increasing sales of local Massachusetts theatres, and the introduction of films that were able to accommodate a synchronized sound and voice track into their reels. Originally, Smith planned to open indoor theatres, but had decided to open a small number of outdoor theatres instead, and later decided to open some indoor theatres as well. The company did not see much growth until 1939, when World War II started, due to heavy sales of news printed on film.

After the war ended, the company had assumed new leadership under Richard A. Smith, who had decided on pushing the company towards indoor movie theaters for all future expansions and had opened the country's first shopping-center theatre, in Framingham Mall.

Starting in the 1960s General Cinema diversified into other businesses. At times they owned the department store Neiman Marcus, the publisher Harcourt Brace, radio stations in several major markets (notably WEFM in Chicago, KRBE in Houston, WZGC in Atlanta, WGCL in Cleveland, and WIFI in Philadelphia), and TV station WCIX in Miami. They formed a joint venture theater chain with Hoyts, known as Hoyts General Cinema, that had locations throughout South America.

In 1976, the company teamed up with Lew Grade's Associated Television Corporation to form Associated General Films, which produced films including Voyage of the Damned and Capricorn One but the partnership ended the following year and ATV's ITC Entertainment subsidiary started financing films on its own.

In April 1992, the company collaborated with Lucasfilm to create mascots for the company. Within less than a year, the then-iconic Candy Band was created. Soon after, two more mascots were developed and named Popcorn Bob, and Pepsi Sue. All three developments were used in preshow reels from 1993 to 2002.

In 1993, General Cinema's holding company, by then named Harcourt General, spun off General Cinema as a separate company. The company suffered greatly when it filed for Chapter 11 bankruptcy in October 2000 and Chapter 7 bankruptcy in October 2001. On December 7, 2001, AMC Theatres agreed to buy GC Companies, Inc. as part of GC's Chapter 11 reorganization plan. The acquisition was completed on March 29, 2002. With the acquisition, the Credits loyalty program merged into the MovieWatcher network.

The General Cinema Corp. trademark was placed up for auction on December 8, 2010. In December 2011, this trademark was published for opposition by JTE Multimedia. On March 11, 2014, the USPTO declared the trademark "General Cinema" abandoned.

References

External links
 Some Early History of General Cinemas From the Grand Opening Ad of the Cinema in Daytona Beach, FL

1935 establishments in the United States
2002 disestablishments in the United States
AMC Theatres
American companies established in 1935
Entertainment companies disestablished in 2002
Companies that filed for Chapter 11 bankruptcy in 2000
Companies that have filed for Chapter 7 bankruptcy
Conglomerate companies of the United States
Former cinemas in the United States
Entertainment companies established in 1935
Movie theatre chains in the United States
Defunct companies based in Massachusetts
Chestnut Hill, Massachusetts
2002 mergers and acquisitions
Smith family (theaters)